Five O'Clock Charlie was a Canadian pop/rock band from Edmonton, Ontario.

History
Five O'Clock Charlie was formed in 2001. It was originally a side project of singer/songwriter Craig Schram's ska/punk band, Tunuki;  Schram was joined by Tunuki guitarist Steve Tchir.<ref>"The Provincial Archive boast a new EP, record label — and attitude". Edmonton Journal',  Sandra Sperounes, April 27, 2016</ref>  In 2002 Dave Meagher joined the band on drums and glockenspiel, and in the same year Trevor Belley joined the band on bass guitar.

In 2002 the band released an EP titled Redtown. Its debut full-length album, Five O'Clock'', was released in 2004, and their song "Five O'Clock" appeared on local radio charts.

Five O'Clock Charlie disbanded in 2007, shortly after the release of their EP 'Watercolours'.  In December 2007 Five O'Clock Charlie played a farewell show at the Pawnshop in  Edmonton, Alberta with Edmonton rockers, Mark Birtles Project.

References 

Musical groups established in 2001
Musical groups disestablished in 2007
Musical groups from Edmonton
Canadian alternative country groups
2001 establishments in Alberta
2007 disestablishments in Alberta